Bertha Zillessen  (1872–1936) was a German painter and photographer. She was the first professional photographer in Bautzen.

Biography
Zillessen was born on 17 October 1872 in Rheydt, Mönchengladbach, Germany. As a young woman she moved to Witten and there she began learning about photography. She continued her training in Berlin and Düsseldorf where she studied with Erwin Quedenfeldt. Around 1908 she moved to Bautzen with her partner, Margarethe Karow, and the pair start a photography studio  They began the commercial enterprise with portrait photography. Zillessen eventually turned to landscape photography and she became a successful postcard photographer.  Her copper gravure images were published by Deutschen Heimatbilder and Saxon Heimatschutzverein. Zillessen is considered to be the first professional photographer in Bautzen.

Zillessen died on 13 January 1936 in Bautzen. In 2019 the Museum Bautzen held a retrospective of her work.

References

External links
 

1872 births
1936 deaths
People from Mönchengladbach
20th-century German women artists
20th-century women photographers